Engelstad is a Norwegian surname. Notable people with the surname include: 

Carl Fredrik Engelstad (1915–1996), Norwegian writer, playwright, and journalist
Eivind Stenersen Engelstad (1900–1969), Norwegian archaeologist and art historian 
Fredrik Engelstad, Norwegian sociologist
Gunvald Engelstad  (1900–1972), Norwegian politician for the Labour Party  
Helen Engelstad (1908–1989), Norwegian art historian and educator
Jess Julius Engelstad (1822–1896), Norwegian engineer and railroad administrator
Kai Arne Engelstad, Norwegian speed skater 
Kirsten Engelstad, Norwegian librarian 
Oscar Engelstad (1882–1972), Norwegian gymnast who competed in the 1912 Summer Olympics
Ralph Engelstad (1930–2002), American businessman, owner of the Imperial Palace Hotel and Casino
Roxann Engelstad, American mechanical engineer
Sigurd Engelstad (1914–2006) Norwegian genealogist and archivist

See also
Betty Engelstad Sioux Center, an indoor arena in Grand Forks, North Dakota  
Ralph Engelstad Arena (old), a multi-purpose arena in Grand Forks, North Dakota  
Ralph Engelstad Arena (Minnesota), an indoor arena in Thief River Falls, Minnesota

Norwegian-language surnames